Walter Joseph Mattick (March 12, 1887 – November 5, 1968) was a Major League Baseball center fielder who played for the Chicago White Sox from – and briefly for the St. Louis Cardinals in . He batted and threw right-handed.

Mattick's son Bobby Mattick played 5 seasons in the 1930s and 1940s, mostly with the Chicago Cubs.

External links

1887 births
1968 deaths
Major League Baseball center fielders
Baseball players from St. Louis
Chicago White Sox players
St. Louis Cardinals players
Minor league baseball managers
Oskaloosa Quakers players
Pueblo Indians players
Des Moines Boosters players
Kansas City Blues (baseball) players
Vernon Tigers players
Dallas Giants players
Dallas Marines players
Dallas Submarines players